William Simmonds may refer to:

William Simmonds (craftsman) (1876–1968), English draftsman, artist and craftsman
William Simmonds (cricketer) (1892–1957), English cricketer
William Simmonds Chatterley (1787–1822), English actor
William Henry Simmonds (1860–1934), newspaper editor in Tasmania